In physics, interaction-free measurement is a type of measurement in quantum mechanics that detects the position, presence, or state of an object without an interaction occurring between it and the measuring device. Examples include the Renninger negative-result experiment, the Elitzur–Vaidman bomb-testing problem, and certain double-cavity optical systems, such as Hardy's paradox.

In Quantum Computation such measurements are referred to as Counterfactual Quantum Computation, an idea introduced by physicists Graeme Mitchinson and Richard Jozsa. Examples include Keith Bowden's Counterfactual Mirror Array describing a digital computer that could be counterfactually interrogated to calculate whether a light beam would fail to pass through a maze.

Initially proposed as thought experiments, interaction-free measurements have been experimentally demonstrated in various configurations.

Interaction-free measurements have also been proposed as a way to reduce sample damage in electron microscopy.

Counterfactual quantum communication 

In 2012 the idea of counterfactual quantum communication has been proposed and demonstrated. Its first achievement was reported in 2017. According to contemporary conceptions of counterfactual quantum communication, information can thereby be exchanged without any physical particle / matter / energy being transferred between the parties, without quantum teleportation and without the information being the absence of a signal. In 2020 research suggested that this is based on some form of relation between the properties of modular angular momentum with massless current of modular angular momentum current crossing the "transmission channel" with their interpretation's explanation not being based on "spooky action at a distance" but properties of a particle being able to "travel locally through regions from which the particle itself is excluded".

See also 
 Counterfactual quantum computation
 Counterfactual definiteness

References

Bibliography
 
 
 Louis de Broglie, The Current Interpretation of Wave Mechanics, (1964) Elsevier, Amsterdam. (Provides discussion of the Renninger experiment.)
  (Provides a recent discussion of the Renninger experiment).
  (Section 4.1 reviews Renninger's experiment).
 Paul G. Kwiat,  The Tao of Quantum Interrogation,  (2001).
 Sean M. Carroll, Quantum Interrogation , (2006).

External links

Quantum measurement
Philosophy of physics
Thought experiments in quantum mechanics